Edwin Andrés Cardona Bedoya (born 8 December 1992) is a Colombian professional footballer who plays for Argentine Primera Division club Racing Club and the Colombia national team.

Club career

Colombia 
Cardona made his professional debut in 2009 with Atlético Nacional. His performances led him to getting called up for the Colombian under-20 team.

He won an Apertura with Nacional in 2011 before being loaned to fellow Colombian Side Santa Fe. During his brief spell with Santa Fe, Cardona won the 2012 Apertura. The following year, Cardona would join Atlético Junior on a year-long loan.

In 2014, he was brought back to Atletico Nacional, converting himself to a key player in his first two seasons. During his most prominent time at the club, Cardona went on to dispute the final of the 2014 Copa Sudamericana. Despite losing the final against Argentine club River Plate, he was amongst the best players of the tournament, even earning the best young player award. That same year, Cardona was included in Star XI of the Americas.

Monterrey
On 16 December 2014, Cardona signed for Liga MX club Monterrey alongside compatriots Alexander Mejía and Yimmi Chará. On 18 January 2015, Cardona scored his first goal for Los Rayados, netting against Pachuca for the 2014 Clausura. His first brace would come on 7 March against Toluca.

Cardona scored his second brace on 16 August 2015 against Dorados de Sinaloa for the 2015 Apertura. During a match for the 2016 Clausura against Santos Laguna, Cardona was praised for scoring an impressive bicycle kick. Due to this, he was given the nickname "Crackdona" amongst Monterrey fans. The match ended in a 2–1 victory with the first goal for Monterrey being scored by fellow countryman Dorlan Pabón.

On match-day 14, Cardona scored a goal against Club Tijuana by chipping it past Argentine keeper Federico Vilar. Monterrey ended up winning the match thus helping maintain their spot as leaders. The following 8 April, Cardona netted another brace against Jaguares de Chiapas which earned him the man of the match award.

Boca Juniors
On 18 July 2017, the Colombian international joined Argentine giants Boca Juniors on a year-long loan plus a possible six months added if the club advances to the round of 16 at the 2018 Copa Libertadores. Monterrey set a $6 million price tag for Cardona if he were to be signed permanently by Boca Juniors.

On 14 August, Cardona made his official debut against Gimnasia y Tiro for the Copa Argentina where he provided an assist and scored a goal in a 5–0 victory. He made his Superclásico debut on 5 November, scoring a free-kick goal in an eventual 1–2 away win for the Xeneizes.

International career

Youth
Cardona represented his country at the 2009 South American Under-17 Football Championship in Chile, where he became the top scorer with seven goals in seven matches, including a hat-trick in a 3–0 win against Ecuador. In doing so, he tremendously helped his country qualify for the 2009 FIFA U-17 World Cup due to take place in Nigeria from 24 October to 15 November. Cardona was selected to play for his country in the 2011 Toulon Tournament in France. He scored three goals in the Championships including two goals against Ivory Coast and a goal against Mexico in the semi-final. Colombia went on to win the final in a penalty shoot-out against the host nation France.

Senior
On 3 October 2014, Cardona was called up to the Colombian senior team, for the first time, by manager Jose Nestor Pekerman for the team's friendlies against El Salvador and Canada. As a starter, he made his senior debut against El Salvador.

He was called up again for Colombia's national team on 3 November 2014, this time for friendlies against the United States and Slovenia. He assisted Teófilo Gutiérrez in the 86th minute winning goal for an eventual 2–1 victory over the United States. Cardona would score his first goal for the national team against Kuwait in a 3–1 victory. Cardona scored his first goal during an official competition with the Colombian senior team during the CONMEBOL qualifiers for the Russia 2018 World Cup match against Peru which was won by Colombia 2–0.

In May 2018, he was named in Colombia's preliminary 35 man squad for the 2018 World Cup in Russia. However, he did not make the final 23-man-cut.

Controversy 
In a friendly match between Colombia and South Korea in Suwon on 10 November 2017, with Colombia down 0–2 in the 62nd minute, James Rodríguez attempted to pick up Korean player Jin-Su Kim from the ground in a rough manner after Kim was fouled. Korean captain Sung-Yueng Ki lightly shoved Rodríguez, and Rodríguez then fell to the ground while pretending to cover his eye as if Ki slapped his face. Edwin Cardona was caught up in the ensuing scuffle and was caught on camera making a slant-eyed gesture toward the Korean players. Although the incident went unnoticed by the match referee, the incident sparked outrage on social media and calls for heavy FIFA punishment for the Boca Juniors player. Cardona apologized the same day via Twitter, saying that "I didn't mean to disrespect anyone, a country or a race, but if anyone felt offended, or interpreted it in that way, I am sorry." In December 2017 FIFA banned Cardona for five international games, although he would still be able to participate in the upcoming World Cup.

Career statistics

Club

International

Scores and results list Colombia's goal tally first, score column indicates score after each Cardona goal.

Honours
Atlético Nacional
Categoría Primera A: 2011-I, 2014-I

Independiente Santa Fe
Categoría Primera A: 2012-I

Boca Juniors
Argentine Primera División: 2017–18
Copa Argentina: 2019–20
Copa de la Liga Profesional: 2020

Colombia U-20
Toulon Tournament: 2011

Colombia
Copa América Third place: 2016, 2021

Individual
South American Under-17 Football Championship top scorer: 2009
 Star XI of the Americas: 2014

References

External links
 

1992 births
Living people
Colombian footballers
Association football midfielders
Atlético Nacional footballers
Independiente Santa Fe footballers
Atlético Junior footballers
C.F. Monterrey players
Boca Juniors footballers
Racing Club de Avellaneda footballers
Categoría Primera A players
Liga MX players
Argentine Primera División players
Colombia youth international footballers
Colombia under-20 international footballers
Colombia international footballers
Colombian expatriate footballers
Colombian expatriate sportspeople in Mexico
Expatriate footballers in Mexico
Colombian expatriate sportspeople in Argentina
Expatriate footballers in Argentina
2015 Copa América players
Copa América Centenario players
2019 Copa América players
2021 Copa América players
Footballers from Medellín